Novos Baianos (English: New Bahians) were a Brazilian rock and MPB group from Salvador, Bahia, in 1969. The group was active between 1969 and 1979, enjoying success throughout the 1970s. The group had reunions in 1997 and 2015 respectively. Together, the group recorded eight full-length studio albums, as well as two live albums. 

The group was highly influential on Brazilian popular music and Brazilian rock of the 1970s, combining various musical elements from genres such as samba, bossa nova, frevo, baião, choro, and rock n' roll. The group's music was also heavily influenced by 1970s counterculture and the emerging Tropicália artistic movement.

The group's original line-up consisted of Moraes Moreira (vocals and acoustic guitar), Paulinho Boca de Cantor (vocals), Pepeu Gomes (electric guitar), Baby Consuelo (vocals and percussion), and Luiz Galvão (lyrics).

The group regularly collaborated with A Cor do Som, a sub-group within Novos Baianos, which consisted of Dadi Carvalho (bass), Jorginho Gomes (cavaquinho, drums and percussion), José "Baixinho" Roberto (drums and percussion) and Luís Bolacha (percussion). 

Novos Baianos is considered one of the most important and revolutionary groups in Brazilian music, primarily as a result of the success and influence of their second studio album, Acabou Chorare.

History
Novos Baianos was formed in the 1969 and performed publicly for the first time at a show titled "Desembarque dos Bichos, Depois do Dilúvio", presented in Salvador. During this time, the group consisted of Moreira, Boca de Cantor, Consuelo and Galvão.

In 1969, the group participated in the V Festival de Música Popular Brasileira, playing the song 'De vera'. The group's name originated from this performance, which was broadcast on the Rede Record television station, where festival producer, Marcos Antônio Riso exclaimed "Bring up these novos baianos!", referring to where the band originated from ("Novos Baianos" is Portuguese for "new Bahians"). This song would later be featured on the group's first studio album, É Ferro na Boneca, which was recorded in 1970. Initially, the group's sound was a fusion of psychedelic rock with traditional folk elements originating from Brazil.

Originally, the group only played with Pepeu Gomes and Jorginho Gomes during their live performances. However, as time progressed, Gomes started to gain an increasingly important role in the group. After he married Consuelo, Gomes became a full fledged member of the group, and began arranging songs along with Moreira.

In the early 1970s, the group's music began to gravitate more towards the MPB genre, particularly due to Brazilian musician João Gilberto's influence, who frequently visited the group. Their second studio album, Acabou Chorare, contained their most popular tracks, which included 'Brasil Pandeiro', 'Preta Pretinha', 'Mistério do Planeta' and 'Besta é tu'. It was recorded and released on the Som Livre label in 1972, and years later would be ranked as the best Brazilian music album by Rolling Stone magazine. It was around this time that the group incorporated A Cor do Som as an auxiliary band.

In 1972, after recording Acabou Chorare, Novos Baianos moved to a community in Vargem Grande, Rio de Janeiro. During this period, the group lived out of a garage, where they primarily focused on playing soccer and composing music. This period of time influenced the name of their third studio album, Novos Baianos F.C., recorded and released on the Continental label in 1973. The group had a strong hippie image during this time period.

The band released numerous records until their break-up in 1978. In 1974, they recorded the first album without Moreira, who decided to start his own solo career in the mid-1970s. As Moreira had previously been the primary composer and arranger of the band's songs (along with Galvão and Gomes) throughout their previous albums, it was tremendous loss to the group. The remaining members of the group continued producing music after Moreira's departure, incorporating Gato Félix to the group.

In 1976, Carvalho left the group to begin recording and releasing original music with A Cor do Som. In his place, Novos Baianos substituted Didi, the brother of Pepeu Gomes, as the group's bassist. However, the group disbanded in 1979 due to various band members starting their own solo careers. Despite the band's dissolution, Novos Baianos' members reunited many times to celebrate special events (most notably in 1997 and 2015).

In 1997, Luiz Galvão, published Anos 70: Novos e Baianos for Editora 34. In the book, he documents the group's history and its importance to Brazilian music. After Galvão released the book, the group reunited, releasing  the live album Infinito Circular in 1997, which was recorded in Metropolitan, Rio de Janeiro. In 2007, Moreira published A História dos Novos Baianos e Outros Versos, a cordel text on the group. 

In 2009, the band reunited without Moreira to celebrate 40 years of Novos Baianos and their revolutionary role in Brazilian music. The group (with Moreira) later released their second live album in 2017, titled Acabou Chorare - Novos Baianos Se Encontram, which was recorded during the group's 2015-2018 tour.

Band members

Primary members 

 Moraes Moreira – vocals, acoustic guitar (died 2020)
 Paulinho Boca de Cantor – vocals
 Pepeu Gomes  – electric guitar
 Baby Consuelo –  vocals and percussion
 Luiz Galvão – lyrics (died 2022)

A Cor do Som 

 Dadi Carvalho – bass
 Jorginho Gomes – cavaquinho, drums, percussion
 José "Baixinho" Roberto –  drums, percussion
 Luís Bolacha – percussion

Discography

Studio albums 

 1970 – É Ferro na Boneca (RGE)
 1972 – Acabou Chorare (Som Livre)
 1973 – Novos Baianos F.C. (Continental)
 1974 – Novos Baianos (Continental)
 1974 – Vamos pro Mundo (Som Livre)
 1976 – Caia na Estrada e Perigas Ver (Tapecar)
 1977 – Praga de Baiano (Tapecar)
 1978 – Farol da Barra (CBS)

Live albums 

 1997 – Infinito Circular (Globo Polydor)
 2017 – Acabou Chorare - Novos Baianos Se Encontram (Som Livre)

Singles 

 1969 – "Colégio de Aplicação" / "De Vera" (RGE)
 1970 – "Curto da Véu e Grinalda" / "Volta Que o Mundo Dá" (RGE)
 1971 – "Psiu" / "29 Beijos" / "Globo da Morte" / "Mini Planeta Íris" (Maxi single) (RGE)
 1971 – "Dê um Rolê" / "Você Me Dá um Disco?" / "Caminho de Pedro" / "Risque" (Maxi single) (Philips)
 1973 – "No Tcheco Tcheco" / "Boas Festas" (Continental)
 1973 – "A Minha Profundidade" / " O Prato e a Mesa" (Continental)
 1976 – "Ninguém Segura Este País" / "Ovo de Colombo" (Tapecar)
 1979 – "Casei no Natal, Larguei no Reveillon" / "Pra Enlouquecer na Praça" / "Alibabá Alibabou" / "Apoteose do Trio para Dodô" (CBS)

References

External links 
CliqueMusic 
Billboard
 
 

Musical groups established in 1969
Musical groups disestablished in 1979
Brazilian rock music groups
Música popular brasileira musical groups
1969 establishments in Brazil
1979 disestablishments in Brazil
Brazilian progressive rock groups
Brazilian psychedelic rock music groups